The 1978 United States Senate election in Nebraska was held on November 7, 1978. Incumbent Republican U.S. Senator Carl Curtis decided to retire instead of seeking a fifth term. In the elections, Democratic nominee J. James Exon won the open seat.

Candidates

Democratic 
 J. James Exon, Governor of Nebraska

Republican 
 Donald Eugene Shasteen, senate aide

Results

See also 
 1978 United States Senate elections

References 

Nebraska
1978
1978 Nebraska elections